Rosel Walther (née Fischer; 12 January 1928 – 24 August 2006) was a German politician who was a member of the  and the State Council of East Germany.

Life 

Walther was born in Landsberg an der Warthe, Brandenburg, in 1928. She was a teacher in her early life.

In 1949 Walther joined the National Democratic Party of Germany (NDPD). She held leadership positions in the party; including as member of the executive board, director of the party academy, and vice chairperson of the NDPD parliamentary group. In 1964–1969 Walther was a leader of the Democratic Women's League of Germany.

In 1971 she also became a member of the State Council, the GDR's collective head of state, until 1989. She retired after the Peaceful Revolution but remained a member of the Association of Free Democrats, which merged with the Free Democratic Party.

References 

1928 births
2006 deaths
National Democratic Party of Germany (East Germany) politicians
Democratic Women's League of Germany members
Members of the Volkskammer
Female members of the Volkskammer
Members of the State Council of East Germany
Recipients of the Patriotic Order of Merit in bronze
Recipients of the Patriotic Order of Merit in silver
Recipients of the Banner of Labor
Recipients of the Medal of Merit of the GDR